Jorabagan Assembly constituency was a Legislative Assembly constituency of Kolkata district in the Indian state of West Bengal.

Overview
As a consequence of the orders of the Delimitation Commission, Jorabagan Assembly constituency ceases to exist from 2011.
 
It was part of Calcutta North West (Lok Sabha constituency).

Members of Legislative Assembly

Results

1977-2009
In the 2006 state assembly elections, the 142 Jorabagan seat was won by Parimal Biswas of CPI(M) defeating his nearest rival Sanjoy Bakshi of Trinamool Congress. In the 2004 by-elections, Parimal Biswas of CPI(M) defeated Rajesh Kumar Sinha of Congress. The by-election was necessitated by the election of sitting MLA, Sudhansu Seal to parliament from Calcutta North West (Lok Sabha constituency). Sudhansu Seal of CPI(M) defeated Sanjoy Bakshi of Trinamool Congress in 2001. Sanjoy Bakshi representing Congress defeated Sarala Maheswari of CPI(M) in 1996.Subrata Mukherjee of Congress defeated Shantilal Jain of BJP in 1991, and Sarla Maheswari of CPI(M) in 1987 and 1982. Haripada Bharati of Janata Party defeated Hara Prasad Chatterjee of CPI(M) in 1977.

1951-1972
Ila Roy of Congress defeated Haraprasad Chatterjee of CPI(M) in 1972. Nepal Chandra Roy of Congress defeated Haraprasad Chatterjee of CPI(M) in 1971 and 1969. Haraprasad Chatterjee of CPI(M) defeated Nepal Chandra Roy of Congress in 1967. Nepal Chandra Roy of Congress defeated Ajit Kumar Biswas of Forward Bloc (Marxist) in 1962 and 1957. Ram Lagan Roy of Congress defeated Ardhansu Mitra of CPI in independent India’s first election in 1951.

References

Former assembly constituencies of West Bengal
Politics of Kolkata district